Lauren Zurn Collins (born 1980, Wilmington, North Carolina) is an American journalist who has been a staff writer at The New Yorker since 2008. She is the author of When in French: Love in a Second Language (2016).

Since 2010, Collins has been based in Europe, covering stories for the New Yorker from London, Paris, Copenhagen, and other capitals. Fluent in French, Collins currently lives in Paris with her husband and two children.

Bibliography

 
 
 
 
 
 
 
 
 
 
 
 
 
 
 
 
 
 
 
———————
Notes

References

External links 

 Lauren Collins at The New Yorker

1980 births
People from Wilmington, North Carolina
American women journalists
The New Yorker staff writers
Living people
21st-century American women